Pony Creek is a stream in the U.S. state of Indiana.

According to tradition, Pony Creek was named for pony thieves who operated near the creek.

See also
List of rivers of Indiana

References

Rivers of Miami County, Indiana
Rivers of Wabash County, Indiana
Rivers of Indiana